The azure-shouldered tanager (Thraupis cyanoptera), locally called sanhaçu, is a species of bird in the family Thraupidae. It is found in the Atlantic Forest of eastern Brazil.

Its natural habitats are subtropical or tropical moist lowland forest, subtropical or tropical moist montane forest, and heavily degraded former forest. It is becoming rare due to habitat loss.

References

azure-shouldered tanager
Birds of the Atlantic Forest
azure-shouldered tanager
Taxa named by Louis Jean Pierre Vieillot
Taxonomy articles created by Polbot
Taxobox binomials not recognized by IUCN